The Daniel McBean Farmstead (also known as the Eddie Murphy House) is a historic home in Wellsville, Ohio. The farmstead was built in 1846 by Daniel McKay and was added to the National Register of Historic Places on January 12, 2005.

References

Houses on the National Register of Historic Places in Ohio
Federal architecture in Ohio
Houses completed in 1846
Houses in Columbiana County, Ohio
National Register of Historic Places in Columbiana County, Ohio